Canyon Lake is a city and gated community on Canyon Lake reservoir, located in the Inland Empire, Riverside County, California, United States. Canyon Lake began as a master-planned community developed by Corona Land Company in 1968. The City of Canyon Lake was incorporated on December 1, 1990.

History

Etymology

The city of Canyon Lake is named after the reservoir it is built around. Initially, the reservoir was known as Railroad Canyon Reservoir, or Railroad Canyon Lake, but now the reservoir and the community are referred to by the shortened form, Canyon Lake.

Early history
In 1882 the California Southern Railroad built a line from Perris to Elsinore along the east side of the San Jacinto River. The Santa Fe Railroad bought the line and joined it with their line in San Bernardino. Floods in 1884, 1916, and 1927 washed out the tracks, and the Santa Fe Railroad decided to abandon the line. Those were the two parcels that make up most of Canyon Lake today.

Construction started in 1927 to build a dam across the river to store water. It was finished in 1929. Railroad Canyon Reservoir, when built, was one of the largest freshwater lakes for fishing, hunting, and camping in Southern California. The reservoir and the surrounding area were leased as a concession from Temescal Water Company as a recreational area under the operation of the George D. Evans family from 1937 until after World War II. After the war Ray and Alpha Schekel, along with John and Darleen Kirkland, operated the resort until 1949 when the lake was drained for repairs to the floodgates.

Community development
In 1968 the Corona Land Development Company developed the new community.

Canyon Lake began as a master-planned community developed by Corona Land Company in 1968, consisting of 4,801 lots. All but a few roads within the city are privately held and maintained by the Canyon Lake Property Owners Association. The 3 entrances to the Canyon Lake POA areas are gated and guarded, accessible by residents and authorized guests.

Geography
The city of Canyon Lake is located east of Lake Elsinore and Interstate 15, in the southern foothills of the Temescal Mountains. The mountain range is on the western edge of the Perris Block and east of the Elsinore Fault Zone.

The lake has  of shoreline.

Reservoir
The community is named for Canyon Lake reservoir, also known as the Railroad Canyon Reservoir, which it surrounds. It is owned and operated by the Elsinore Valley Municipal Water District.

The reservoir is supplied by stormwater runoff from the San Jacinto River and Salt Creek.  Water from the reservoir feeds the Canyon Lake Water Treatment Plant, which provides approximately 10% of the domestic water supply in the Lake Elsinore/Canyon Lake area.

Demographics

Historically, Canyon Lake has been predominantly non-Hispanic white since its founding. However, in recent decades, more Hispanics, African Americans, and Asians have moved into the city. The proportion of non-Hispanic whites has decreased from 95.5% in 1980 to 74.7% in 2020. Canyon Lake's non-Hispanic white percentage is higher than the California statewide average (36.8%) and the national average of 60.4%.

2020
The 2020 United States Census reported that Canyon Lake had a population of 11,095. 

The racial makeup of Canyon Lake was 80.0% White (74.9% Non-Hispanic White), 1.2% Black or African American, 0.7% Native American, 3.2% Asian American, 0.7% Pacific Islander, 14.2% from other races, and 8.9% from two or more races. Hispanic or Latino of any race were 13.9%.

21.8% of the population was under the age of 18, and 17.6% of the population was 65 years of age or older. 

The 2020 census listed median income in Canyon Lake at $120,118 with 6.4% of residents living below the poverty line.

2010
The 2010 United States Census reported that Canyon Lake had a population of 10,561. The racial makeup of Canyon Lake was 9,495 (89.9%) White (81.7% Non-Hispanic White), 128 (1.2%) Black or African American, 61 (0.6%) Native American, 190 (1.8%) Asian American, 36 (0.3%) Pacific Islander, 316 (3.0%) from other races, and 335 (3.2%) from two or more races. Hispanic or Latino of any race were 1,303 persons (12.3%).

The Census reported that 10,552 people (99.9% of the population) lived in households, 9 (0.1%) lived in non-institutionalized group quarters, and 0 (0%) were institutionalized.

There were 3,935 households, out of which 1,298 (33.0%) had children under the age of 18 living in them, 2,510 (63.8%) were opposite-sex married couples living together, 341 (8.7%) had a female householder with no husband present, 202 (5.1%) had a male householder with no wife present. There were 214 (5.4%) unmarried opposite-sex partnerships, and 27 (0.7%) same-sex married couples or partnerships. 658 households (16.7%) were made up of individuals, and 311 (7.9%) had someone living alone who was 65 years of age or older. The average household size was 2.68. There were 3,053 families (77.6% of all households); the average family size was 2.99.

The population was spread out, with 2,287 people (21.7%) under the age of 18, 835 people (7.9%) aged 18 to 24, 2,304 people (21.8%) aged 25 to 44, 3,332 people (31.6%) aged 45 to 64, and 1,803 people (17.1%) who were 65 years of age or older. The median age was 44.0 years. For every 100 females, there were 99.5 males.  For every 100 females age 18 and over, there were 97.0 males.

The homeowner vacancy rate was 2.9%; the rental vacancy rate was 6.1%. 8,443 people (79.9% of the population) lived in owner-occupied housing units and 2,109 people (20.0%) lived in rental housing units.

According to the 2010 United States Census, Canyon Lake had a median household income of $74,133, with 5.4% of the population living below the federal poverty line.

2000
As of the census of 2000, there were 9,952 people, 3,643 households, and 2,939 families residing in this city. The racial makeup of the city was 92.9% White (87.9% Non-Hispanic White), 0.8% Black or African American, 0.4% Native American, 1.5% Asian, 0.1% Pacific Islander, 1.8% from other races, and 2.4% from two or more races. 8.5% of the population were Hispanic or Latino of any race.

There were 3,643 households, out of which 34.9% had children under the age of 18 living with them, 70.5% were married couples living together, 6.7% had a female householder with no husband present, and 19.3% were non-families. 14.3% of all households were made up of individuals, and 6.8% had someone living alone who was 65 years of age or older. The average household size was 2.73 and the average family size was 3.00.

In the city, the population was spread out, with 25.9% under the age of 18, 5.2% from 18 to 24, 26.9% from 25 to 44, 25.1% from 45 to 64, and 16.9% who were 65 years of age or older. The median age was 41 years. For every 100 females, there were 96.4 males. For every 100 females age 18 and over, there were 98.1 males.

The median income for a household in the city was $70,106, and the median income for a family was $72,317. Males had a median income of $57,413 versus $36,016 for females. The per capita income for the city was $29,646. About 3.0% of families and 4.9% of the population were below the poverty line, including 7.3% of those under age 18 and 1.9% of those age 65 or over.

Crime 
In 2005, there were 12 violent crimes and 136 property crimes reported; in 2006, 18 and 165, in 2007, 23 and 170, in 2008, 6 and 167, in 2009, 12 and 132, in 2010, 10 and 223. Per capita, these are below the national average.

In 1994 serial killer Dana Sue Gray murdered two of her fellow Canyon Lake residents, targeting elderly women who lived alone. Gray also killed an elderly woman in nearby Lake Elsinore and attempted to kill another woman. She robbed all her victims of their cash and credit cards.

Representation
The City of Canyon Lake was incorporated on December 1, 1990.  The elected body of government is the five member city council that is elected at large by the voters of the city.

In the state legislature, Canyon Lake is located in the 28th Senate District, represented by Republican Melissa Melendez and in the 67th Assembly District, represented by Republican Kelly Seyarto.

Politics
Since its date of incorporation, all nine Republican gubernatorial candidates, all eight Republican presidential candidates, and all nine Republican senatorial candidates who qualified for the general election ballot carried Canyon Lake by a margin of at least 23 points, with Donald Trump in 2016, and 2020 as well as George W. Bush in 2000, and 2004 each carrying the city by a margin of over 50 points. Canyon Lake is also one of the few cities in California where Donald Trump received a greater percentage of the vote in 2016 than Mitt Romney did in 2012, as well as one of the few in the state where he received a larger percentage of the vote for re-election (in which he lost to Joe Biden) in 2020.

As of February 27th, 2023, there were 8,189 registered voters in Canyon Lake. Of these voters, 4,887 (59.68%) are registered Republicans, 1,394 (17.02%) are registered Democrats, 1,240 (15.14%) are not affiliated with a political party, and 668 (8.16%) are registered with a third party. Among third parties, the American Independent party had the most registered voters with 405 (4.95%) 

Canyon Lake has the highest percentage of registered Republicans in the counties of Los Angeles, Riverside, San Bernardino, Orange, San Diego or Imperial as of March 2022.

Listed below are all presidential, gubernatorial, and senate results for Canyon Lake since its incorporation:

In addition to the GOP dominating its registration, and elections, Canyon Lake has also displayed a socially conservative bent on California state ballot propositions in recent years. In 2000, California's Proposition 22 which was a state constitutional amendment that banned same-sex marriage received 2,603 votes in Canyon Lake (78.90%) and was opposed by 696 voters (21.10%). Similarly, in 2008, California's Proposition 8 a similar measure that also banned same-sex marriage in California, received 3,609 votes (69.29%) in Canyon Lake and was opposed by 1,599 voters (30.71%). Also in 2008, California's Proposition 4 which would have required parental notification before a minor received an abortion received 3,003 votes in favor (59.11%) and 2,077 votes against (40.89%) in Canyon Lake.

In 1994, California's Proposition 187, which set up a state screening service for undocumented immigrants passed in Canyon Lake with 2,905 votes (82.05%) vs 615 votes against (17.95%). This was much higher than the 58% of the vote the measure passed by statewide.

In the 2003 California gubernatorial recall election, 82.53% of all votes cast were in support of the recall of Gray Davis. Similarly, in the 2021 California gubernatorial recall election, 79.37% of all votes cast were in support of the recall of Gavin Newsom.

Infrastructure

Security
All gates are manned twenty-four hours a day by a community patrol contracted by US Security Associates. Access is granted to outsiders by sponsorship from a property owner or renter who calls in their guests to a 24-hour answer line. Since becoming an incorporated city in 1990, Canyon Lake has its own police department (through a contract with the Riverside County Sheriff's Department, out of the Lake Elsinore Station), as well as the private security services. In recent years specialized "code enforcement" officers have also maintained patrols of the approximately  parcel of land administered by the Bureau of Land Management which encompasses the eastern shore of the lake in its upper reaches. The trail running north along the eastern shore of the lake has become an inviting activity for hikers and birdwatchers, particularly in the winter months when the hills are green and temperatures lower. Canyon Lake forbids all public use of any "two-wheeled motorized vehicle" (that is, all motorcycles, mopeds, and dirt bikes) on all private streets throughout the CLPOA, but excluding the two public roads (Railroad Canyon and Goetz Roads).<ref>Carolyn Knight (November 3, 2006). Motorcycle Prohibition Upheld . thefridayflyer.com; The Friday Flyer. Retrieved July 10, 2010.</ref>

In popular culture
In 2006, the community was the subject of United Gates of America'', a BBC television documentary directed by Alex Cooke, featuring journalist Charlie LeDuff. He lived for a month within the community, to explore why people wanted to lock themselves behind gates and fences, and what effect it had on the residents. LeDuff also explored the issues of immigration from Mexico and Central America, and highlighted the issues of segregation and racism that exist in the United States. The film was the subject of some controversy within the community, but received positive reviews in the UK and other parts of the US.

References

External links
 

 
Cities in Riverside County, California
Gated communities in California
Incorporated cities and towns in California
San Jacinto River (California)
Temescal Mountains
Populated places established in 1990
1990 establishments in California